The Holbav is a right tributary of the river Șercaia in Romania. It flows into the Șercaia south of Șinca Nouă.

References

Rivers of Romania
Rivers of Brașov County